Nitish is a first name for males, often found in the South Asian community. It means master of the correct way or right path.
Nitish Bharadwaj, Indian actor
Nitish Jain,  Indian educationist
Nitish Kumar (cricketer), Canadian cricketer
Nitish Kumar, Bihar Chief Minister
Nitish Mishra, Indian Politician
Nitish Rana, Indian Cricketer
Nitish Roy, Indian film art director
Nitish Sengupta, Indian Armed Services officer
Nitish Katara murder case
Nitish Chatterjee, Chief Executive Officer and owner of Cadis

References 

Hindu given names
Indian masculine given names